Ambient 1: Music for Airports is the sixth studio album by the English musician Brian Eno, released in 1978 by Polydor Records. It is the first of Eno's albums released under the label of ambient music, a genre of music intended to "induce calm and a space to think" while remaining "as ignorable as it is interesting". While not Eno's earliest entry in the style, it is credited with coining the term.

The album consists of four compositions created by layering tape loops of differing lengths, and was designed to be continuously looped as a sound installation, with the intent of defusing the tense, anxious atmosphere of an airport terminal. Eno defined his approach in opposition to "canned" Muzak and easy listening practices. The album was the first of four albums released in Eno's Ambient series, which concluded with 1981's Ambient 4: On Land.

In 2004, Rolling Stone credited the album with defining the ambient genre. In 2016, Pitchfork ranked it the greatest ambient album of all time.

Background and concept
Eno became interested in ambience when he suffered an automobile accident that sent him to the hospital in the mid-1970s. His friend Judy Nylon visited Eno in the hospital and left an album playing quietly before leaving. The sound blended with the rain outside the room and, unable to get up and adjust the volume, Eno allowed it to create an ambience aligned with his fluctuating attention. The album Discreet Music (1975), per Eno's own judgement, was his first foray into ambient music.

After spending several hours waiting for a flight at Germany's Cologne Bonn Airport and becoming annoyed by its uninspired atmosphere, Eno conceived an album of music "designed for airports". He intended for the album to still function within various other situations. Ambient music was then a "relatively modest field", "more a concept than a genre", and mostly created against the context of dominant muzak practices. Eno's concept was distinct from elevator music and easy listening's "derivative" background noise approach, and was instead to be used as a means of creating space for thought. In the album's liner notes, Eno explained:

Whereas conventional background music is produced by stripping away all sense of doubt and uncertainty (and thus all genuine interest) from the music, Ambient Music retains these qualities. And whereas their intention is to `brighten' the environment by adding stimulus to it (thus supposedly alleviating the tedium of routine tasks and levelling out the natural ups and downs of the body rhythms) Ambient Music is intended to induce calm and a space to think. Ambient Music must be able to accommodate many levels of listening attention without enforcing one in particular; it must be as ignorable as it is interesting.

Eno later named the Ray Conniff Singers and the "Borgesian idea" of a self-generated "world in reverse" which is centered around music as inspirations during this period.

Recording and composition
All tracks were composed by Eno except "1/1", which was co-composed by Eno with former Soft Machine drummer and vocalist Robert Wyatt and with producer Rhett Davies.

Music for Airports makes use of spliced tape loops. Recalling its creation, Eno said it was "conceived as deliberately austere and unemotional" and "was essentially made by machines". He began work during the creation of David Bowie's Low. With regards to their instrumentation, dynamic range, timbre, harmony, tonality and texture, the tracks are confining and feature a "contained repertory of pitches, gestural shapes, and motivic content that lasts throughout its entirety". Variations of timbre are seen when comparing the tracks, such as the warm "1/1" contrasting with the cold and dark "1/2". They are without backing rhythms and instead irregular repetition.

He has stated a connection to death. Not wanting it to be "all bright and cheerful", Eno, a self-proclaimed "nervous flyer", considered the feelings that arise from being at an airport, including the supposed mortality salience and hoped the album would bring solace: "Really, it’s music to resign you to the possibility of death". John L. Waters described the album as a "logical progression from the work of the experimental and systems-based 'serious' musicians (John White, Gavin Bryars, Christopher Hobbs, Michael Parsons, Michael Nyman) that Eno recorded and championed for his label Obscure". David Stubbs noted similarities to the work of Erik Satie.

"1/1", features piano loops performed in an arrhythmic manner – piano being the dominant instrument throughout the album. The track arose from two pianists improvising whereby neither could clearly hear the other, leading to separate yet complimentary melodies being played. Various motifs, played in a fitful manner, are featured. Philosopher of art John Lysaker, while discussing the album's general sense of aimless direction, noted that "1/1" "holds together no better (and no worse) than a cloud". The music throughout is down-tempo, without "distinct melodic or harmonic development[;] no highs or lows". "1/1" is the only track to feature a melody.

"2/1" and "1/2" make use of vocal loops; the former designed to have them fluctuate in synchrony. The disparate lengths of "2/1" were the result of each singer's differing capabilities. He modified the tape recordings offhandedly to loops, desiring "a silence at least twice as long as the sound" and "complicated rather than simple relationships". "And then I started all the loops running, and let them configure in the way they chose to configure". Music professor Victor Szabo described the track as "ghostly", writing that the "non-vibrato" tape loops are "uncannily lifeless": "Through such compositional techniques and affective-expressive codes, ‘2/1’ intimates human absence more overtly than any other track".

"2/2" was performed with an ARP 2600 synthesiser. Brian Eno described how this piece was recorded:

Release

Critical reception 

The first album of ambient music to become popular – and later recognised as the "first deliberately 'ambient' recording" – it was initially dismissed by critics, audiences and some of Eno's peers alike, bewildering some of the former. It only became more favoured by the 1990s, having "entered the modern musical canon".

Blandness was a very common critique in the initial reviews, a possible by-product of its unvarying and populist conception, wrote Szabo. In a 1979 review for Rolling Stone, Michael Bloom found Ambient 1 self-indulgent and lacking focus. "There's a good deal of high craftsmanship here," Bloom said. "But to find it, you've got to thwart the music's intent by concentrating." In another contemporary review for The Village Voice, critic Robert Christgau wrote that "these four swatches of modestly 'ambient' minimalism have real charms as general-purpose calmatives. But I must also report that they've fared unevenly against specific backgrounds." He later called it "a bore". Writing for The Globe and Mail, around the time of its release, Alan Niester categorized the album as alien, calling it "background grunge" that was best suited for "dish-doing [and] bed-making". In a 1979 interview with Eno for Musician, critic Lester Bangs described Music for Airports as having "a crystalline, sun-light-through windowpane quality that makes it somewhat mesmerising even as you half-listen to it," and recounted a personal experience in which the album induced him into a dream state featuring Charles Mingus.

PopMatters journalist John Davidson was enthusiastic in a retrospective review, deeming Music for Airports a masterpiece whose value "can only be appreciated by listening to it in a variety of moods and settings. Then you are likely struck by how the music allows your mind the space to breathe", Davidson wrote, "and in doing so, adapts itself to your mood". AllMusic reviewer Linda Kohanov stated that "like a fine painting, these evolving soundscapes don't require constant involvement on the part of the listener [...] yet the music also rewards close attention with a sonic richness absent in standard types of background or easy listening music." Sasha Frere-Jones wrote that, by strength of its compositions, Music for Airports fails to facilitate an easily disregarded listening experience: "the album is too beautiful to ignore". Sal Cinquemani of Slant Magazine described the effect of the compositions as "sheer weightlessness." Q described it as "soothing and sublime, a useful album when you're feeling particularly delicate." In a positive review, Pitchforks Liam Singer wrote that the album "gives the listener nothing to hold onto, remaining as transitory as its location", and added that it "realizes music's capacity to unify contrasting conceptions of time."

Legacy
Ambient 1 was included in the book 1001 Albums You Must Hear Before You Die. Chuck Eddy from Spin later named it the fourth most essential ambient album. In September 2016, Pitchfork named the record the best ambient album of all time.

The album has been recognized as a seminal and influential release, an icon of the genre and Eno's discography. J. D. Considine wrote in The Rolling Stone Album Guide that the record defined the ambient aesthetic while providing a name for the genre. Chris Richards of The Washington Post wrote that it "taught an entire generation of musicians to consider music as a texture". Reflecting on the album, Jon Caramanica called it the best of Eno's work which shortly followed Roxy Music. Due in part to Music for Airports, perception of Eno's career shifted and he became aligned with highly influential minimalist composers: Steve Reich, Philip Glass, Terry Riley, and La Monte Young. Artists such as Pauline Oliveros, Riley and Harold Budd would expand on Eno's style of ambient music, which would feature prominently on his following albums; Music for Airports acted as a genesis for Eno and collaborators exploring the style, such as in the numbered Ambient series (1978–82). His conception would soon become more mallable and less reliant upon locations.

Over the years, the album has sold over 200,000 copies, making it one of his best-selling solo albums.

Installation and covers
The album has been installed and performed in at least five airports; it has been met with resistance from some travellers and workers, who deem it disruptive. Clinics and hospitals have used the albums to soothe patients. In 1998, Bang on a Can performed the album live, favouring a "technicolour style". Discussing their performance, Eno described it as the ensemble "trying to act like machines, but they don't sound like machines at all, they sound like people and it's quite touching when that appears". He felt the rendition's emotive quality was the result of the supposed human element; it moved him to tears, he said, and others he knew – such as Lou Reed and Laurie Anderson – had similar reactions. Critics echoed Eno's praise, including that of the rendition's superiority.

In 2010, The Black Dog, by means of their ninth studio album, Music for Real Airports, issued a "musical rebuttal", chastising the perceived dehumanisation of airports and Eno's supposed intention of "lull[ing] customers".

Track listing

The track labelling refers to the album's first release (1978) as an LP, and so the first track means "first track, first side", and so on. The CD pressing adds 30 seconds of silence after every track, including "2/2".

The album's back cover features four abstract graphic notation images, one for each track, representing their structure and instrumentation.

Personnel
 Brian Eno – synthesiser, electric piano, vocals
 Christa Fast – vocals ("2/1", "1/2")
 Christine Gomez – vocals ("2/1", "1/2")
 Inge Zeininger – vocals ("2/1", "1/2")
 Robert Wyatt – acoustic piano ("1/1", "1/2")

Recording
 Brian Eno – producer, engineer
 Dave Hutchins – engineer ("2/1", "1/2")
 Conny Plank – engineer ("2/2"),
 Rhett Davies – engineer ("1/1")

Design
 Brian Eno – cover art

Recording Location
 London ("1/1", "1/2", "2/1")
 Plank's Studio, Cologne ("2/2")

Release history

Certifications

Usage
 Mistaken Memories of Mediaeval Manhattan is a 1981, 47-minute ambient video created by Eno which uses music from both the albums Ambient 4: On Land and this album. This title was later included with his Thursday Afternoon video on the Rykodisc DVD compilation 14 Video Paintings.
 Music from the album has been covered by:
 Makyo — "2/1 (Night Flight Mix)", on the double compilation CD Minimalism: More Or Less, 1998, Law & Auder (LA05CD)
nalptenalp, "Re: 1/1" (2020), which is a reconstruction of "1/1".
 Arrangements of the album performed by the Bang on a Can All-Stars were made into a video filmed and edited by Frank Scheffer, entitled Music For Airports / In The Ocean
 The first track is used in the PBS special The Creation of the Universe. Eno is the sole music credit, and he also wrote original music for the documentary.
 "1/1" is frequently used as background music on the US public radio program This American Life.
 "1/1" is used as background music in the 1986 film 9½ Weeks.
 "1/1" features prominently in the opening scene of the 2009 motion picture The Lovely Bones.
 Excerpts of Ambient 1 appear in Robert Hughes' documentary on Modern Art The Shock of the New, episode 4 Trouble in Utopia.
Prior to the first hosted live broadcast of Apple's Beats 1 internet radio station, music from the album was played on the service's audio stream.

See also
 Ambient 2: The Plateaux of Mirror
 Ambient 3: Day of Radiance
 Ambient 4: On Land

Notes

References

External links 

 
 Interview on Ambient 1: Music for Airports
 Liner notes of initial American release
 Interview, Artpress, Sep 2001
 Interview, Keyboard Wizards, Winter 1985
 Interview, Reality Hackers, Winter 1988
 Eno lecture, New Music New York, 1979
 The Wire, Stansted Airport BoaC performance, June 1998

Brian Eno albums
1978 albums
Albums produced by Brian Eno
E.G. Records albums
Concept albums
Albums about aircraft